The Josaphat Brownfield (formerly the Schaerbeek Josaphat marshalling yard) is a  piece of land located between Schaerbeek and Evere in Brussels. Once a marshalling yard between the Meiser railway station and the Evere railway station linking Schaerbeek and Halle, the brownfield has since developed into a biodiversity haven in the heart of the European Union's capital.

History  
The station was inaugurated on July 19, 1926, as the Terdelt garden city neighbourhood was being developed. The freight station was operated until 1994 and used six tracks.

First owned by the SNCB, then Infrabel, the decommissioned area was bought by the Regional Administration of Brussels on December 30, 2005 through its Urban Development Corporation (SAU-MSI). It has since been subject to various urban projects.

In 2013, the land was backfilled and cleaned up. It naturally rewilded due to the absence of human activity and became a prosperous area for biodiversity. Several nonprofits dedicated to nature conservation such as Natagora and Natuurpunt have since highlighted the brownfield's ecological importance.

Biodiversity  
As of December 2020, 1,175 species were identified on the nature observation platform observations.be, with 526 in 2020 alone. The wealth in biodiversity can be attributed to both the absence of human activity and Brussels being located below several important bird migration routes.

Among the observed species: 
 114 birds 
 190 Hymenoptera, of which:
 120 wild bees 
 112 moths
 33 butterflies
 32 Odonatas (both dragonflies and damselflies)
 88 beetles 
 14 Orthoptera (Caelifera and grasshoppers)

Some species are extremely rare, such as the Anthidium septemspinosum which had not been recorded in Belgium before.

Controversy  
Since 2018, the Brussels-Capital Region has developed an urbanistic tool allowing it to derogate from all previous relevant legislation like land use and maximal legal building height. Named Plan d'Aménagement Directeur (PAD), these master plans allow for rapid execution and ignore the basics of citizen participation. They were based on a projected demographic boom justifying the construction of thousands of housing units throughout the region. However, recent statistics have shown the population growth to be of roughly 2,000 people per year, compared to the 10,000 initially communicated.

The Josaphat Brownfield is one of ten strategic locations the Brussels-Capital Region deemed fit for a PAD. Though the land is currently owned by a limited liability company under public law, in the Urban Development Corporation of the Brussels-Capital Region, they plan to sell it to a private developer. The project currently states only 45% of the housing units will be publicly owned. Numerous citizens, nonprofits and pressure groups have raised awareness as the development is in the heart of a city where over 40,000 households are waiting to be allocated public housing.

Parallelly, critics have been imploring the government to stop the excessive construction on land that provides increasingly rare ecosystem services in the centre of Brussels. The warming climate has stressed the importance of green space in cities suffering from the urban heat island effect due to an ocean of concrete. The Josaphat Brownfield provides an exceptional breath of fresh air in such a congested and polluted city. Ecologist have also insisted that the area be preserved given the risk of a sixth mass extinction.

Citizen mobilisation 
For the past couple of years, citizens have joined forces to raise awareness on the risks the area faces in terms of rapid urbanisation and biodiversity loss. A petition with over 9,500 signatories and a Facebook group counting 4,500 active members have put the subject in the news.

See also 
 Belgian railway line 26
 History of rail transport in Belgium

References 

Schaerbeek
Urban decay in Europe
Rail transport in Belgium
Urban renewal